Andrea Aguilera Arroyave (born 10 March 1997) is a Colombian model, TV presenter, and beauty queen. She is the winner and holder of the titles Miss World Colombia 2021 and Miss Earth Colombia 2022. She represented Colombia in Miss World 2021 where she managed to be part of the Top 13. She also represented her country in Miss Earth 2022.

Early life and education 

Aguilera was born on 10 March 1997, in the city of Medellín, Antioquia. She grew up in a very artistic and active environment, participating in singing competitions, learning to play different instruments and also taking acting courses. She is a graduate of social communication and journalism from the Luis Amigó Catholic University of that city.

Pageantry

Miss World 2021 
She represented Colombia in the 70th edition of the Miss World contest, which took place on March 16, 2022, in San Juan, Puerto Rico at the José Miguel Agrelot Coliseum of Puerto Rico where she placed in the Top 13, being the winner the Polish Karolina Bielawska.

Miss Earth Colombia 2022 
On 10 September 2022, Aguilera was appointed by the Miss Earth Colombia organization to represent her country in Miss Earth 2022 to be held in the Philippines.

Miss Earth 2022 
She represented her country on the 22nd edition of the Miss Earth contest.

competing with 86 delegates from various countries and territories. Which was held on November 29, 2022, at Okada Manila in Parañaque, Metro Manila, Philippines. At the end of the event, she was crowned Miss Earth Fire 2022 by Jareerat Petsom of Thailand. The winner of the contest was the South Korean Mina Sue Choi.

Awards
 Best Eco Video (Americas)
 Miss Photogenic (Fire Group)
 Best in Swim-Wear (Fire Group)
 Ms. Spotlight

Medals
  Darling of the Press (Americas)
  Swimsuit Competition (Americas)
  Beach Wear Competition (Fire Group)
  Long Gown Competition (Fire Group)

References

External links 
 

1997 births
Living people
Miss World 2021 delegates
Miss Earth 2022 contestants
Colombian female models
Colombian beauty pageant winners
Luis Amigó Catholic University alumni
People from Medellín